Kral is the surname of the following notable people: 
Gustav Kral (1983–2009), Austrian football player
 Irene Kral (1932–1978), American jazz singer
Pamela Keevil Kral (born 1955), British actress 
 Robert J. Kral (born 1967), Australian film and television composer
Roy Kral (1921–2002), American jazz pianist and vocalist
Soch Kral (1782–1854), Kashmiri Sufi poet, and is a Sufi saint 
Thomas Kral (born 1990), Austrian football player